is Thelma Aoyama's second official single, released on January 23, 2008, featuring SoulJa. It is an answer song to her previous collaboration with SoulJa, "Koko ni Iru yo." B-side "My dear friend" was used as the ending theme to anime Shion no Ō, and the opening theme to television show Ryuuha-R.

The single reached the number 1 position on Japan's Oricon charts in its second week and sold over 450,000 compact discs. In addition, it sold over 7 million downloads, including 2 million complete downloads, by July 2008. In September 2008, the Guinness World Records certified the song as "the best selling download single in Japan" for the number of full-track downloads. On May 28, 2009, however, it was announced that the record was replaced by Greeeen's song "Kiseki". It was later admitted by the Guinness World Records.

It was also the best-selling download single on the iTunes Store 2008 yearly charts in Japan.

Taiwanese band Da Mouth sang their cover version of "Koko ni Iru yo" on their album Wang Yuan Kou Li Kou.

"Soba ni Iru ne" was also covered by Sly and Robbie on their album Amazing.

Track listing
 "Soba ni Iru ne feat. SoulJa"
 "My dear friend"
 "This Day feat. Dohzi-T"

Charts
Oricon Sales Chart (Japan)

Total sales as of 11 February 2009 - 464,835

Certifications

References

External links

2008 singles
Thelma Aoyama songs
Oricon Weekly number-one singles
Songs written by SoulJa
2008 songs
Universal J singles